The 1988 Cheltenham Council election took place on 5 May 1988 to elect members of Cheltenham Borough Council in Gloucestershire, England. One third of the council was up for election. The Conservatives made a net gain of one seat, which left them one seat short of a majority, meaning the council stayed in no overall control.

After the election, the composition of the council was
Conservative 16
Social and Liberal Democrats 14
Labour 2
Residents Associations 1

Election result

Ward results

References

Cheltenham
Cheltenham Borough Council elections
1980s in Gloucestershire